Samuel Gourlay Goodwin (14 March 1943 – 9 March 2005) was a Scottish footballer, who played for Airdrieonians, Crystal Palace, Motherwell and Clydebank. He was later manager of Albion Rovers before becoming a director of the club.

Goodwin died at the age of 61 in March 2005.

References

External links

1943 births
2005 deaths
People from Tarbolton
Association football midfielders
Scottish footballers
Craigmark Burntonians F.C. players
Airdrieonians F.C. (1878) players
Crystal Palace F.C. players
Motherwell F.C. players
Clydebank F.C. (1965) players
Albion Rovers F.C. managers
Scottish Football League players
English Football League players
Scottish Junior Football Association players
Scottish football managers
Footballers from South Ayrshire